The Indian locomotive class XE (X Eagle) was a class of  "Mikado" type steam locomotives used on  broad gauge lines in India.  The model was the largest of the "Pacific" class, with a 7 ft (2.1 m) diameter boiler.

Variants
AWE: Made by Baldwin Locomotive Works during and post World War II period when British manufacturers could not meet demand.

Preservation
However, there are only five XE's preserved around India, XE 3634 (22541) is restored to working order at Rewari, 22577, and 22580 are both preserved private at MP Electricity Board, XE's 22531 and 22558 are preserved privately by UP Cement Corporation,

See also

Rail transport in India#History
Indian Railways
Locomotives of India

References

Bibliography

Railway locomotives introduced in 1928
XE
Vulcan Foundry locomotives
William Beardmore and Company locomotives
2-8-2 locomotives
5 ft 6 in gauge locomotives